"I Can't Get Close Enough" is a song written by J.P. Pennington and Sonny LeMaire and recorded by American country music group Exile.  It was released in August 1987 as the first single from the album Shelter from the Night.  The song was Exile's tenth and final number one country hit.  The single went to number for one week and spent a total of fourteen weeks on the country chart.

Charts

References

1987 singles
1987 songs
Exile (American band) songs
Songs written by J.P. Pennington
Epic Records singles
Songs written by Sonny LeMaire